Supermall may refer to:

 SM Supermalls, the largest chain of shopping malls in the Philippines
 The Outlet Collection Seattle, formerly known as SuperMall of the Great Northwest or Supermall